O'Brien is an unincorporated community in Suwannee County, Florida, United States, located along U.S. Route 129 at the intersection of County Road 349, north of Branford.  O'Brien has a post office with ZIP code 32071.

References

Unincorporated communities in Suwannee County, Florida
Unincorporated communities in Florida
Former census-designated places in Florida